Christmas Shopping is a Christmas album by Buck Owens and His Buckaroos released in 1968 charting for one week at # 31 on Billboard'''s Best Best For Christmas Album chart. It is his second holiday-themed album, following 1965's Christmas with Buck Owens''.

It was re-issued on CD by Sundazed Records in 1999, and again via digital download in 2011.

Reception

In his Allmusic review, critic Cub Koda called the album "a more slickly produced album than its predecessor."

Track listing
All songs by Buck Owens unless otherwise noted.

Side one
"Christmas Shopping" – 2:18
"Christmas Time Is Near" (Owens, Red Simpson) – 3:00
"The Jolly Christmas Polka" – 2:15 (instrumental)
"All I Want for Christmas Is My Daddy" (Owens, Jimmy Snyder) – 2:51
"Merry Christmas from Our House to Yours" – 2:50
"Good Old Fashioned Country Christmas" (Owens, Earl Poole Ball) – 2:36

Side two
"One of Everything You Got" (Owens, Bob Morris) – 2:24
"Home on Christmas Day" – 2:13
"Christmas Schottische" – 2:05 (instrumental)
"A Very Merry Christmas" – 2:29
"It's Not What You Give" (Owens, Morris) – 3:03
"Tomorrow Is Christmas Day" (Owens, Don Rich) – 1:59

References

1968 Christmas albums
Buck Owens albums
Capitol Records Christmas albums
Christmas albums by American artists
Albums produced by Ken Nelson (United States record producer)
Country Christmas albums
Albums recorded at Capitol Studios